Ross Gray (born 21 September 1992) is a Scottish footballer currently playing as a midfielder for Bonnyrigg Rose in the Scottish Junior Football Association, East Region. He has previously played in the Scottish Football League First Division for Livingston.

Career

Livingston
A product of Livingston's youth team, Gray made his first team début as a substitute on 7 May 2011, against Alloa Athletic on the final day of the season. The following season on 9 August 2011, he came on as a substitute in Livingston's 5–0 victory over Stirling Albion in the Challenge Cup. After just two first team appearances he was loaned out to Berwick Rangers. Another loan spell followed and on 8 May 2012, he signed a one-year contract extension to remain with the club. In October 2012, Gray was once again loaned to Berwick.

Berwick Rangers
On 21 October 2011, he was loaned to Third Division side Berwick Rangers on a one-month emergency loan deal, making his début the following day in the Scottish Cup. Gray went on to make his league debut on 5 November against Elgin City. After four appearances for Berwick his loan deal was extended by an extra month. He scored his first competitive goal on 26 November, in their 5–3 win over Montrose at Links Park. Berwick requested his loan be extended further but due to injuries at Livingston he was recalled. His return to Livingston was short and on 7 January 2012, he returned to Berwick until 5 May. In all he made 20 appearances for Berwick.

The following season on 27 October 2012, Gray returned to Berwick on a three-month loan deal. He made his debut the same day, coming on as a 58th-minute substitute against Queen's Park, replacing Neil Janczyk in a 1–1 draw. After leaving Livingston, Gray signed for Berwick permanently in May 2013.

Released by Berwick manager Colin Cameron in the summer of 2015, Gray signed for Lowland League side Selkirk before moving on to Spartans in January 2016. He signed for Junior side Linlithgow Rose in July 2016.

Career statistics

References

External links
 

Living people
1992 births
Scottish footballers
Association football defenders
Livingston F.C. players
Berwick Rangers F.C. players
Selkirk F.C. players
Spartans F.C. players
Linlithgow Rose F.C. players
Scottish Football League players
Scottish Professional Football League players
Scottish Junior Football Association players
Place of birth missing (living people)
Lowland Football League players
Bonnyrigg Rose Athletic F.C. players